Endothelial protein C receptor (EPCR) also known as activated protein C receptor (APC receptor) is a protein that in humans is encoded by the PROCR gene. PROCR has also recently been designated CD201 (cluster of differentiation 201).

The protein encoded by this gene is a receptor for protein C that enhances its activation. Protein C is an anti-coagulant serine protease activated by the blood coagulation pathway.

Structure
EPCR protein is an N-glycosylated type I membrane protein that enhances the activation of protein C. It belongs to the MHC class I/CD1 family of proteins, that is characterized by having a deep groove, that in other proteins in the family (but not in EPCR) is usually used for antigen binding.

Like the CD1 series, EPCR has a lipid in the corresponding groove. The bound lipid in EPCR is usually phosphatidylcholine, but it may be phosphatidylethanolamine, and it contributes to protein C binding, though probably not through direct contact

Clinical significance 

Mutations in this gene have been associated with venous thromboembolism and myocardial infarction, as well as with late fetal loss during pregnancy.

The protein is also involved in Plasmodium falciparum malaria as subtypes of the Plasmodium falciparum erythrocyte membrane protein 1 (PfEMP1) family use EPCR of the host as a receptor.

References

Further reading

External links 
 

Clusters of differentiation